Nevill Bay is a long and narrow waterway in Kivalliq Region, Nunavut, Canada. The Ferguson River empties into the bay opposite Bibby Island.

References

Bays of Kivalliq Region